Pristimantis muscosus is a species of frog in the family Strabomantidae. It is only found on the Cordillera del Condor of southern Ecuador and northern Peru.

Its natural habitats are humid, upper montane forests. The Peruvian population occurred on rocky banks of a stream. It is potentially threatened by habitat loss.

References

muscosus
Amphibians of Ecuador
Amphibians of Peru
Amphibians described in 1999
Taxonomy articles created by Polbot